Lincoln and the Power of the Press: The War for Public Opinion is a book by Harold Holzer, which was published by Simon & Schuster in 2014.

Awards
It received the Lincoln Prize in 2015.

References

2014 non-fiction books
Books about Abraham Lincoln
Simon & Schuster books